The 107th Rocket Artillery Brigade is a rocket-launcher brigade of the Ukrainian Ground Forces, stationed at Kremenchuk. It was formed from a reorganisation of the previous 107th Rocket Artillery Regiment which itself was formed out of the 107th Rocket Brigade. It is now part of Operational Command East.

History 
The brigade traces its lineage back to the Red Army's 67th Howitzer Artillery Brigade, formed on 16 December 1942 near Moscow. In May 1943 it had completed training and was armed with the 122 mm howitzer M1938 (M-30). The brigade fought near Leningrad and in Ukraine, Moldova, Romania, and Hungary. The brigade finished the war in Austria. During the war, the brigade received seventeen thanks from Stalin. The brigade received the honorific "Leningrad" and was awarded the Order of Kutuzov 2nd class.

Postwar, the brigade was based in Ukraine and Hungary. The brigade was successively based in Dnipropetrovsk, Bila Tserkva, and Kiev. It later moved to Kremenchuk.

The 107th Rocket Brigade was activated in October 1967 in Kremenchuk with the 6th Guards Tank Army. It was equipped with R-11 Zemlya and R-17 Elbrus tactical ballistic missiles. It included the 661st and two other separate missile battalions, as well as a technical battery. During the 1980s, it was co-located with a mobilization rocket brigade. In January 1992, it was taken over by Ukraine.

The brigade received the Tochka-U in 2003. In 2005, the brigade became a regiment and was reequipped with the 9K58 Smerch. In 2008, the regiment was awarded the honorific "Kremenchuk".

On 18 November 2015, the regiment's "Leningrad Order of Kutuzov" honorifics were removed as part of a Ukrainian Armed Forces-wide removal of Soviet awards and decorations. On January 1, 2019, the regiment was reorganised as a brigade.

References

Brigades of Ukraine
Artillery units and formations of Ukraine
Military units and formations established in 2005